Silvano Prandi (born 13 November 1947, in San Benedetto Belbo) is an Italian volleyball coach, currently the head coach of Chaumont Volley-Ball 52.  In 1980, his men's professional team, CUS Torino Pallavolo, won the European Champions League.  He was the head coach of the Italy men's national volleyball team from 1982-1986, in which he won the Bronze medal at the 1984 Olympics in Los Angeles, California. He was also the head coach of the Bulgaria men's national volleyball team from 2008-2010.

References

 Profile   Legavolley
 CVB52 Chaumont 
 Ligue Nationale de Volley

1947 births
Italian volleyball coaches
Living people
Sportspeople from the Province of Cuneo